is a Japanese motorcycle racer. He currently races in the All Japan Road Race JSB1000 Championship aboard a CBR1000RR-R.

Career statistics

Grand Prix motorcycle racing

By season

Races by year
(key)

References

External links

Japanese motorcycle racers
Living people
1996 births
Moto3 World Championship riders